Bowery Champs is a 1944 American film directed by William Beaudine and starring the East Side Kids.

Plot
After she files for divorce from nightclub owner Tom Wilson, former Broadway star Gypsy Carmen demands that he return the securities that she owned before their marriage. When Wilson claims that the securities are missing, Gypsy pulls a gun from her purse and aims it at him. At that moment, a gun is fired through the window of his house. Tom falls dead and Gypsy flees in panic.

At the time of the murder, Jim Lindsey, the star reporter of the American Express paper, is busily bidding on oriental rugs at an auction and consequently misses the story. Deciding to cover the murder for the absent Jim, Muggs McGinnis, who is working as a copy boy on the paper, asks Glimpy to drive him to the Wilson house in the paper's delivery car. At the house, Muggs and Glimpy sneak through an open window and listen as the police interrogate Wilson's mistress, Diane Gibson, an entertainer at the nightclub, and Ken Duncan, Wilson's manager. Duncan recalls that Gypsy threatened Wilson's life, and the police lieutenant states that a .38 caliber bullet was used to kill Wilson. The houseboy then reveals that right after the murder, he saw a woman wearing a "fuzzy coat and funny hat" hail a yellow cab with a dented fender.

After purchasing his rug, Jim hears about the murder and hurries to the Wilson house to investigate. Meanwhile, Muggs, Glimpy and the other East Side Kids go to the taxi stand and learn from the driver hat he delivered a woman wearing a fuzzy coat to the Stephens apartment building, where Gypsy lives. As Muggs and the boys drive to the apartment building, the police arrive at the taxi stand, question the driver and dispatch a car to arrest Gypsy. When Muggs and the boys question Gypsy, she protests her innocence. Noticing the police car pull up to the curb, Muggs instructs Skinny to don Gypsy's hat and coat and speed away in the newspaper's car.

After the police follow Skinny, Muggs tells Gypsy to disguise herself as a boy and escorts her to the safety of the boys' clubhouse. Skinny drives to the Wilson house, watches as Diane leaves and follows her. At the clubhouse, Gypsy shows her gun to Muggs, who recognizes it as a .32 caliber, and Muggs pronounces that it is not the murder weapon. Jim, meanwhile, searches for clues at the Wilson house and finds a button in the hallway. Surmising that it belongs to the murderer, Jim takes the button to show his publisher, Lester Cartwright. As Jim exhibits his clue, the police arrive to question Cartwright about the strange woman driving the Express's car. Upon seeing the button, the police take Cartwright in for questioning, and Cartwright, furious, fires Jim.

Skinny, meanwhile, has followed Diane to the Pussy Cat Café, where she turns Gypsy's stolen securities over to Duncan. Skinny then telephones his sister and instructs her to find Muggs and send him to the café. Muggs has returned to the newspaper office and, learning of Jim's predicament, accompanies him to the clubhouse to interview Gypsy. When Skinny's sister, Jane  finds them outside the clubhouse and relates Skinny's message to Muggs, Muggs tells Jim to deliver Gypsy to police headquarters while he meets Skinny. Gypsy has left the clubhouse, however, and when Jim finds the room deserted, he dispatches the police to the café.

Skinny is eavesdropping outside the door to Duncan's office when one of Duncan's henchmen finds him and imprisons him in a room. After Diane leaves the office to perform her act, Gypsy enters, pulls out her gun and demands that Duncan return the securities. Just then, Diane re-enters the room and begins to wrestle with Gypsy. As Skinny struggles with his captor in the next room, Muggs and the boys arrive and join the fray. Soon after, the police come to arrest Diane and Duncan, and Jim breaks the story about the capture of Wilson's murderers.

Cast

The East Side Kids
Leo Gorcey as Ethelbert 'Muggs' McGinnis
Huntz Hall as Glimpy McClusky
Billy Benedict as Skinny
Bobby Jordan as Bobby Jordan
Jimmy Strand as Danny
Buddy Gorman as Shorty

Additional Cast
Gabriel Dell as Jim Lindsay
Evelyn Brent as Gypsy Carmen
Ian Keith as Ken Duncan
Thelma White as Diane Gibson
Frank Jaquet as Lester Cartwright
Anne Sterling as Jane
Wheeler Oakman as Tom Wilson
Fred Kelsey as McGuire
William Ruhl as Lieutenant
Kenneth MacDonald as Henchman
Betty Sinclair as Apartment Manager
Francis Ford as Sports Writer
Eddie Cherkose as Scoop
Joe Bautista as Houseboy
Bernard Gorcey as Mr. Johnson, taxi driver (uncredited)
Jack Mulhall as Sgt. Ryan (uncredited)

Production
It was filmed under the title Mr. Muggs Meets a Deadline.

While on leave from military duty, Bobby Jordan visited the set during its filming and he was written into the film (as himself) at the last minute.

The film marks Jimmy Strand's last East Side Kids film, while it includes Leo Gorcey's father, Bernard, as Mr. Johnson, the taxi driver.

References

External links 
 

1944 films
1944 comedy films
1940s English-language films
American black-and-white films
Monogram Pictures films
Films directed by William Beaudine
Films produced by Sam Katzman
American comedy films
East Side Kids
1940s American films